Luay K. Nakhleh (Arabic): لؤي نخله; born May 8, 1974) is a Palestinian-Israeli-American computer scientist and computational biologist who is the William and Stephanie Sick Dean of the George R. Brown School of Engineering, a Professor of Computer Science and a Professor of BioSciences at Rice University in Houston, Texas.

Biography 
Nakhleh was born on May 8, 1974 to a Christian, Palestinian family in Israel. He currently lives with his Japanese wife and two children in Texas, and holds both U.S. and Israeli citizenship.

Nakhleh did his undergraduate studies in the Department of Computer Science at the Technion, Israel Institute of Technology, earning a bachelor's degree in 1996. He earned a master's degree in Computer Science from Texas A&M University in 1998, and a PhD degree in Computer Science from the University of Texas at Austin, under the supervision of Prof. Tandy Warnow, in 2004. Nakhleh started his academic position at Rice University in July 2004, and became a Full Professor in 2016.  He served as the J.S. Abercrombie Professor of Computer Science from July 2018 until December 2020. Nakhleh served as Chair of the Computer Science Department at Rice University from 2017 to 2020.

In addition to his duties as the Dean of Engineering at Rice University, Nakhleh currently teaches courses in discrete mathematics and computational biology. Nakhleh has received high acclaim at Rice University for his skills in teaching, and he is the recipient of many awards in this area.

Research 

Nakhleh's research has been focused mainly on computational and statistical approaches to phylogenomics and comparative genomics under 
scenarios where the evolutionary history of the genomes is not treelike. His earlier work in this area focused on parsimonious phylogenetic networks: networks that embed a given set of trees with the lowest number of reticulations, assuming all gene tree incongruence is due to reticulate evolution. He and his colleagues also applied similar approaches to language data to elucidate the (reticulate) 
evolutionary history of the Indo-European languages. Their paper on perfect phylogenetic networks was included as one of the 20 best papers published in Language, the flagship journal of the Linguistic Society of America, in the 30-year period 1986-2016.

Later, his work started focusing on statistical approaches, in order to account for other evolutionary processes that could be at play in genomic data sets, most notably incomplete lineage sorting. These approaches could be viewed as approximations of the multispecies coalescent with gene flow.

Additionally, Nakhleh has done research on biological networks (modeling and evolution) and, more recently, on computational questions arising in cancer genomics.

Nakhleh and his group have been developing PhyloNet, an open-source software package, implemented in Java, for inference and analysis of (explicit) phylogenetic networks.

Honors and awards 
Nakhleh's honors and awards include:
 The National Science Foundation CAREER Award, 2009.
 The Sloan Fellowship in the Molecular Biology category, 2010.
 The Guggenheim Fellowship in the Organismic Biology and Ecology category, 2012.

References 

Living people
Rice University faculty
American computer scientists
1974 births